Wu Bin is the name of the following Chinese people:

Wu Bin (painter), Ming dynasty painter
Wu Bin (wushu coach), martial arts coach
Wu Bin (driver), bus driver who became a folk hero for saving his passengers despite his injuries
Wu Bin (fencer), Fencer
Wu Bin (swimmer), Paralympic swimmer